Radical Face is a musical act whose main member is Ben Cooper.

History

2003–2010: Early years
Cooper chose the name Radical Face upon seeing it on a flyer. He later learned it was a plastic surgery flyer for a 'Radical Face-Lift' with the word 'lift' ripped off.

Cooper's first album to be recorded under the Radical Face pseudonym was The Junkyard Chandelier (2003). The album was never formally released but has since been available as a free download online. Ghost, released in 2007, was the first official studio album by Radical Face.

2010–2016: The Family Tree
On November 16, 2010, Cooper released a six-track EP titled Touch The Sky, which served as a prelude for an announced trilogy of albums called The Family Tree.

The Family Tree albums follows four generations of the fictional Northcote family, and is narratively based in the 19th and early 20th centuries. Comprising over 30 songs, the trilogy details the lives of an extensive list of family members as they confront war, death, progress, and the supernatural abilities certain family lines possess. Cooper uses different instruments to represent certain family members throughout the trilogy, utilizing only instruments that would have been available at the time the stories take place.

The first entry in the series, The Roots, was officially released on October 4, 2011; however it was accidentally released to users outside of the US on iTunes in August. It was followed by The Branches in October 2013, and The Leaves in March of 2016.

Leading up to the release of The Roots, the first of four EPs of songs that did not make the final cut on the main albums called The Bastards: Volume One was released track by track. The Bastards: Volume Two was released in 2013, following the release of The Branches, and volumes three and four were released in 2015, prior to the release of The Leaves in 2016.

2016–present: Missing Film, EPs, and upcoming projects 
The sixth Radical Face album, Missing Film, was released in 2018. The album is fully instrumental, and was released under an open license with the intention for the songs to be used by independent filmmakers without the need for paying royalties.

Since 2017 Radical Face has released a number of EPs, the first being SunnMoonnEclippse, released February 10. The EPs full video is available on a website of the same name.

Starting in August 2020, Cooper released a monthly mailer named "Hidden Hollow". A new song was included with each letter. The last letter posted in February 2021, and the six songs were released as the “Hidden Hollow, Vol. 1 EP.”

According to Cooper, he has been working on a project called Into the Woods since 2019, describing it as an album with accompanying visual art and prose created by himself.

In Popular Culture

The single "Welcome Home" has been featured in a number of ads, TV shows, and films. It was used as theme in Nikon's worldwide campaign "I'M NIKON".

The songs "Welcome Home", "Baptisms", "Always Gold", "The Road to Nowhere", "Summer Skeletons", "Letters Home" were featured in the American crime thriller television series The Blacklist.

Discography

Albums

EPs

Singles

Music videos

References

External links
Official Page
The Sounds & Sights of Radical Face - Short documentary by Justin Mitchell
Radical Face Live in San Francisco - 2011 Behind the Scenes video By Connor Ellmann

Living people
Musical groups from Jacksonville, Florida
Musicians from Jacksonville, Florida
American indie rock musicians
Year of birth missing (living people)
Nettwerk Music Group artists
Morr Music artists